Hulman can refer to:
the Hulman family
a fictitious Northern Indiana town, the setting for the movie a Christmas Story